The 2009–10 Barys Astana season was the Kontinental Hockey League franchise's 2nd season of play. The 2009–10 season saw Barys have a very similar season than the previous. Veteran Jozef Stümpel finished top scorer of the team, with 13 goals and 39 assists (52 points), two better than Maxim Spiridonov, who was the best goal scorer of the team with 24. Fan favourite Kevin Dallman also was a major contributor, with 14 goals and 27 assists. Newcomer Jeff Glass did a fine job between the pipes, with 19 wins and a 2.87 goals against average, helping the team finish fourteenth overall of the KHL, a one place improvement from 2008–09. Barys was however once again swept in three games by Ak Bars Kazan in the first round of the playoffs.

Standings

Division standings
Source: Kontinental Hockey League Official Website

Conference standings
Source: Kontinental Hockey League Official Website

Divisions: KHA – Kharlamov Division, CHE – Chernyshev Division

Schedule and results

Regular season

|-  style="text-align:center; background:#d0e7ff;"
| 1 || 12 September || Avangard Omsk || 1–0 (OT) || Alexei Kuznetsov || Kazakhstan Sports Palace || 5,000 || 0–0–1–0 || 2 || 
|-  style="text-align:center; background:#fcc;"
| 2 || 14 September || Dynamo Moscow || 4–5 || Alexei Kuznetsov || Luzhniki Minor Arena || 1,800 || 0–1–1–0 || 2 || 
|-  style="text-align:center; background:#cfc;"
| 3 || 16 September || Dinamo Riga || 4–2 || Jeff Glass || Arena Riga || 4,916 || 1–1–1–0 || 5 || 
|-  style="text-align:center; background:#cfc;"
| 4 || 18 September || Dinamo Minsk || 2–1 || Jeff Glass || Minsk Sports Palace || 3,500 || 2–1–1–0 || 8 || 
|-  style="text-align:center; background:#d0e7ff;"
| 5 || 22 September || Lada Togliatti || 2–1 (SO) || Jeff Glass || Kazakhstan Sports Palace || 4,800 || 2–1–2–0 || 10 || 
|-  style="text-align:center; background:#ffeeaa;"
| 6 || 24 September || Ak Bars Kazan || 4–5 (SO) || Jeff Glass || Kazakhstan Sports Palace || 5,200 || 2–1–2–1 || 11 || 
|-  style="text-align:center; background:#ffeeaa;"
| 7 || 26 September || Neftekhimik Nizhnekamsk || 1–2 (SO) || Alexei Kuznetsov || Kazakhstan Sports Palace || 4,000 || 2–1–2–2 || 12 || 
|-  style="text-align:center; background:#fcc;"
| 8 || 29 September || Salavat Yulaev Ufa || 1–2 || Alexei Kuznetsov || Kazakhstan Sports Palace || 5,250 || 2–2–2–2 || 12 || 
|-

|-  style="text-align:center; background:#fcc;"
| 9 || 1 October || Lokomotiv Yaroslavl || 3–5 || Ildar Mukhometov || Arena 2000 || 8,900 || 2–3–2–2 || 12 || 
|-  style="text-align:center; background:#ffeeaa;"
| 10 || 3 October || Spartak Moscow || 2–3 (SO) || Jeff Glass || Sokolniki Arena || 3,100 || 2–3–2–3 || 13 || 
|-  style="text-align:center; background:#fcc;"
| 11 || 5 October || HC MVD || 1–5 || Alexei Kuznetsov || Balashikha Arena || 2,000 || 2–4–2–3 || 13 || 
|-  style="text-align:center; background:#fcc;"
| 12 || 7 October || Avangard Omsk || 3–6 || Jeff Glass || Omsk Arena || 10,200 || 2–5–2–3 || 13 || 
|-  style="text-align:center; background:#cfc;"
| 13 || 10 October || Amur Khabarovsk || 4–2 || Alexei Kuznetsov || Kazakhstan Sports Palace || 4,500 || 3–5–2–3 || 16 || 
|-  style="text-align:center; background:#cfc;"
| 14 || 13 October || Sibir Novosibirsk || 4–3 || Alexei Kuznetsov || Ice Sports Palace Sibir || 5,000 || 4–5–2–3 || 19 || 
|-  style="text-align:center; background:#ffeeaa;"
| 15 || 15 October || Metallurg Novokuznetsk || 2–3 (OT) || Alexei Kuznetsov || Kuznetsk Metallurgists Arena || 3,300 || 4–5–2–4 || 20 || 
|-  style="text-align:center; background:#cfc;"
| 16 || 19 October || CSKA Moscow || 5–2 || Jeff Glass || Kazakhstan Sports Palace || 5,000 || 5–5–2–4 || 23 || 
|-  style="text-align:center; background:#cfc;"
| 17 || 21 October || Torpedo Nizhny Novgorod || 4–2 || Jeff Glass || Kazakhstan Sports Palace || 4,950 || 6–5–2–4 || 26 || 
|-  style="text-align:center; background:#cfc;"
| 18 || 23 October || Vityaz Chekhov || 3–1 || Jeff Glass || Kazakhstan Sports Palace || 5,000 || 7–5–2–4 || 29 || 
|-  style="text-align:center; background:#ffeeaa;"
| 19 || 26 October || SKA Saint Petersburg || 2–3 (SO) || Jeff Glass || Ice Palace Saint Petersburg || 5,300 || 7–5–2–5 || 30 || 
|-  style="text-align:center; background:#cfc;"
| 20 || 28 October || Atlant Moscow Oblast || 3–0 || Jeff Glass || Mytishchi Arena || 4,000 || 8–5–2–5 || 33 || 
|-  style="text-align:center; background:#cfc;"
| 21 || 30 October || Severstal Cherepovets || 3–1 || Jeff Glass || Ice Palace Cherepovets || 2,000 || 9–5–2–5 || 36 || 
|-

|-  style="text-align:center; background:#fcc;"
| 22 || 1 November || Salavat Yulaev Ufa || 3–4 || Jeff Glass || Ufa Arena || 8,250 || 9–6–2–5 || 36 || 
|-  style="text-align:center; background:#cfc;"
| 23 || 12 November || Metallurg Magnitogorsk || 7–1 || Jeff Glass || Kazakhstan Sports Palace || 5,500 || 10–6–2–5 || 39 || 
|-  style="text-align:center; background:#d0e7ff;"
| 24 || 14 November || Avtomobilist Yekaterinburg || 5–4 (OT) || Alexei Kuznetsov || Kazakhstan Sports Palace || 4,900 || 10–6–3–5 || 41 || 
|-  style="text-align:center; background:#fcc;"
| 25 || 16 November || Traktor Chelyabinsk || 3–5 || Alexei Kuznetsov || Kazakhstan Sports Palace || 4,300 || 10–7–3–5 || 41 || 
|-  style="text-align:center; background:#d0e7ff;"
| 26 || 18 November || Avangard Omsk || 3–2 (OT) || Jeff Glass || Kazakhstan Sports Palace || 4,700 || 10–7–4–5 || 43 || 
|-  style="text-align:center; background:#fcc;"
| 27 || 22 November || Sibir Novosibirsk || 3–5 || Jeff Glass || Ice Sports Palace Sibir || 6,500 || 10–8–4–5 || 43 || 
|-  style="text-align:center; background:#d0e7ff;"
| 28 || 24 November || Metallurg Novokuznetsk || 3–2 (OT) || Jeff Glass || Kuznetsk Metallurgists Arena || 2,700 || 10–8–5–5 || 45 || 
|-  style="text-align:center; background:#cfc;"
| 29 || 26 November || Amur Khabarovsk || 4–3 || Jeff Glass || Kazakhstan Sports Palace || 4,250 || 11–8–5–5 || 48 || 
|-  style="text-align:center; background:#cfc;"
| 30 || 28 November || Metallurg Novokuznetsk || 3–2 || Jeff Glass || Kazakhstan Sports Palace || 4,500 || 12–8–5–5 || 51 || 
|-  style="text-align:center; background:#fcc;"
| 31 || 30 November || Sibir Novosibirsk || 3–4 || Alexei Kuznetsov || Kazakhstan Sports Palace || 4,000 || 12–9–5–5 || 51 || 
|-

|-  style="text-align:center; background:#fcc;"
| 32 || 3 December || Avangard Omsk || 2–1 || Alexei Kuznetsov || Omsk Arena || 10,020 || 12–10–5–5 || 51 || 
|-  style="text-align:center; background:#ffeeaa;"
| 33 || 5 December || Salavat Yulaev Ufa || 2–3 (SO) || Alexei Kuznetsov || Kazakhstan Sports Palace || 5,500 || 12–10–5–6 || 52 || 
|-  style="text-align:center; background:#cfc;"
| 34 || 7 December || Traktor Chelyabinsk || 4–2 || Jeff Glass || Traktor Ice Arena || 4,500 || 13–10–5–6 || 55 || 
|-  style="text-align:center; background:#fcc;"
| 35 || 9 December || Metallurg Magnitogorsk || 0–4 || Jeff Glass || Magnitogorsk Arena || 5,244 || 13–11–5–6 || 55 || 
|-  style="text-align:center; background:#fcc;"
| 36 || 11 December || Avtomobilist Yekaterinburg || 2–5 || Alexei Kuznetsov || Yekaterinburg Sports Palace || 3,500 || 13–12–5–6 || 55 || 
|-  style="text-align:center; background:#fcc;"
| 37 || 13 December || Salavat Yulaev Ufa || 4–1 || Jeff Glass || Ufa Arena || 8,250 || 13–13–5–6 || 55 || 
|-  style="text-align:center; background:#fcc;"
| 38 || 23 December || Severstal Cherepovets || 3–4 || Jeff Glass || Kazakhstan Sports Palace || 4,400 || 13–14–5–6 || 55 || 
|-  style="text-align:center; background:#ffeeaa;"
| 39 || 25 December || Atlant Moscow Oblast || 4–5 (SO) || Jeff Glass || Kazakhstan Sports Palace || 4,000 || 13–14–5–7 || 56 || 
|-  style="text-align:center; background:#fcc;"
| 40 || 27 December || SKA Saint Petersburg || 1–5 || Alexei Kuznetsov || Kazakhstan Sports Palace || 5,100 || 13–15–5–7 || 56 || 
|-

|-  style="text-align:center; background:#cfc;"
| 41 || 3 January || CSKA Moscow || 5–3 || Jeff Glass || CSKA Ice Palace || 3,100 || 14–15–5–7 || 59 || 
|-  style="text-align:center; background:#fcc;"
| 42 || 5 January || Torpedo Nizhny Novgorod || 3–5 || Alexei Kuznetsov || Trade Union Sport Palace || 5,500 || 14–16–5–7 || 59 || 
|-  style="text-align:center; background:#fcc;"
| 43 || 7 January || Vityaz Chekhov || 1–5 || Alexei Kuznetsov || Ice Hockey Center 2004 || 3,000 || 14–17–5–7 || 59 || 
|-  style="text-align:center; background:#cfc;"
| 44 || 11 January || Sibir Novosibirsk || 5–0 || Alexei Kuznetsov || Kazakhstan Sports Palace || 4,850 || 15–17–5–7 || 62 || 
|-  style="text-align:center; background:#fcc;"
| 45 || 13 January || Metallurg Novokuznetsk || 0–3 || Alexei Kuznetsov || Kazakhstan Sports Palace || 4,800 || 15–18–5–7 || 62 || 
|-  style="text-align:center; background:#fcc;"
| 46 || 18 January || Amur Khabarovsk || 3–5 || Jeff Glass || Platinum Arena || 7,100 || 15–19–5–7 || 62 || 
|-  style="text-align:center; background:#cfc;"
| 47 || 19 January || Amur Khabarovsk || 8–5 || Jeff Glass || Platinum Arena || 7,100 || 16–19–5–7 || 65 || 
|-  style="text-align:center; background:#fcc;"
| 48 || 24 January || HC MVD || 2–4 || Alexei Kuznetsov || Kazakhstan Sports Palace || 4,800 || 16–20–5–7 || 65 || 
|-  style="text-align:center; background:#d0e7ff;"
| 49 || 26 January || Lokomotiv Yaroslavl || 3–2 (OT) || Jeff Glass || Kazakhstan Sports Palace || 4,800 || 16–20–6–7 || 67 || 
|-  style="text-align:center; background:#cfc;"
| 50 || 28 January || Spartak Moscow || 9–3 || Jeff Glass || Kazakhstan Sports Palace || 5,200 || 17–20–6–7 || 70 || 
|-

|-  style="text-align:center; background:#fcc;"
| 51 || 3 February || Ak Bars Kazan || 1–4 || Jeff Glass || TatNeft Arena || 4,620 || 17–21–6–7 || 70 || 
|-  style="text-align:center; background:#cfc;"
| 52 || 5 February || Lada Togliatti || 2–1 || Jeff Glass || Volgar Sports Palace || 2,900 || 18–21–6–7 || 73 || 
|-  style="text-align:center; background:#fcc;"
| 53 || 7 February || Neftekhimik Nizhnekamsk || 2–4 || Jeff Glass || Neftekhimik Ice Palace || 5,500 || 18–22–6–7 || 73 || 
|-

|-  style="text-align:center; background:#cfc;"
| 54 || 3 March || Dinamo Minsk || 5–3 || Alexei Kuznetsov || Kazakhstan Sports Palace || 5,100 || 19–22–6–7 || 76 || 
|-  style="text-align:center; background:#fcc;"
| 55 || 5 March || Dinamo Riga || 3–5 || Jeff Glass || Kazakhstan Sports Palace || 5,100 || 19–23–6–7 || 76 || 
|-  style="text-align:center; background:#cfc;"
| 56 || 7 March || Dynamo Moscow || 5–2 || Jeff Glass || Kazakhstan Sports Palace || 5,300 || 20–23–6–7 || 79 || 
|-

|-
|

Playoffs

|-  style="text-align:center; background:#fcc;"
| 1 || 11 March || Ak Bars Kazan || 3–4 (3OT) || Jeff Glass || TatNeft Arena || 5,900 || 0–1 || 
|-  style="text-align:center; background:#fcc;"
| 2 || 12 March || Ak Bars Kazan || 2–4 || Jeff Glass || TatNeft Arena || 5,900 || 0–2 || 
|-  style="text-align:center; background:#fcc;"
| 3 || 14 March || Ak Bars Kazan || 1–3 || Jeff Glass || Kazakhstan Sports Palace || 5,500 || 0–3 || 
|-

|-
|

Player statistics
Source: Kontinental Hockey League Official Website

Skaters

Goaltenders

Final roster
Updated 14 March 2010.

|}

Draft picks

Barys Astana's picks at the 2009 KHL Junior Draft in Moscow, Russia, on 1 June 2009.

See also
2009–10 KHL season

References

Barys Astana seasons
Astana
Barys